Dane is a small village west of the town of Ribnica in southern Slovenia. The area is part of the traditional region of Lower Carniola and is now included in the Southeast Slovenia Statistical Region.

A small roadside chapel-shrine in the eastern part of the settlement dates to the 19th century.

References

External links
Dane on Geopedia

Populated places in the Municipality of Ribnica